The enzyme 4-nitrophenylphosphatase (EC 3.1.3.41) catalyzes the reaction

4-nitrophenyl phosphate + H2O  4-nitrophenol + phosphate

This enzyme belongs to the family of hydrolases, specifically those acting on phosphoric monoester bonds.  The systematic name of this enzyme class is 4-nitrophenylphosphate phosphohydrolase. Other names in common use include nitrophenyl phosphatase, p-nitrophenylphosphatase, ''para-nitrophenyl phosphatase, K-pNPPase, NPPase, PNPPase, Ecto-p-nitrophenyl phosphatase, and p''-nitrophenylphosphate phosphohydrolase.  This enzyme participates in γ-hexachlorocyclohexane degradation.

Structural studies

As of late 2007, only one structure has been solved for this class of enzymes, with the PDB accession code .

References

 
 

EC 3.1.3
Enzymes of known structure